The following is a list of teams that participated on the 2013–14 World Curling Tour.

Men
As of September 25, 2013

Women
As of September 30, 2013

References
World Curling Tour: Men's teams
World Curling Tour: Women's teams

External links
World Curling Tour: Home

Teams
2013 in curling
2014 in curling
World Curling Tour teams